Kulittalai taluk is a taluk of Karur district of the Indian state of Tamil Nadu. The headquarters of the taluk is the town of Kulittalai

Demographics
According to the 2011 census, the taluk of Kulittalai had a population of 206,580 with 101,935  males and 104,645 females. There were 1027 women for every 1000 men. The taluk had a literacy rate of 66.05. Child population in the age group below 6 was 10,826 Males and 10,590 Females.

Kulithalai is second biggest taluk in karur District. Periyyar bridge to connect musiri taluk of Trichirappalli district.

References 

Taluks of Karur district